Jacksonia anthoclada  is a plant in the Fabaceae family. It is endemic to Western Australia.

The species was described in 2007 by Jennifer Anne Chappill and others. 
It is found in the IBRA region of the  Geraldton Sandplains.

Description 
Jacksonia is an erect shrub,  growing from 1.5 m to 2.5 m high on white or grey sands. Its yellow and red flowers are seen in April.

References

External links 
 Jacksonia anthoclada occurrence data from the Australasian Virtual Herbarium

anthoclada
Flora of Western Australia